Eleonore of Löwenstein-Wertheim (Eleonore Maria Anna; 16 February 1686 – 22 February 1753) was a Princess of the Löwenstein-Wertheim-Rochefort. She was the Landgravine of Hesse-Rotenburg by marriage. Baptised as Eleonore Maria Anna, she was known as Eleonore meaning 'true and perpetual beauty'.

Early life 
Born in Vienna, as a sixth child to Maximilian Karl Albert, Prince of Löwenstein-Wertheim-Rochefort and his wife, Countess Maria Polyxena Khuen of Lichtenberg and Belasi (1658-1712).

Biography
Her father had entered imperial service at a young age, was an imperial counselor from 1684 thus her birth in Vienna, the capital of the Holy Roman Empire then ruled by  Leopold I.

Her mother was a member of the family who ruled the County of Lichtenberg und Belasi. Her parents were first cousin's. She herself would marry her first cousin; Eleonore's paternal aunt Princess Maria Anna of Löwenstein-Wertheim-Rochefort had married William, Landgrave of Hesse-Rheinfels-Rotenburg, father of her husband Ernest Leopold of Hesse-Rotenburg, William's son and heir.

The couple married in  Frankfurt on 9 November 1704, the bride being 18 and the groom 20. They were parents of 10 children, five of which would have progeny. She outlived her husband by three years.

Her eldest granddaughter, Princess Eleonora of Savoy, was named after her. Her eldest grandson was Victor Amadeus III of Sardinia.

Issue

 Joseph of Hesse-Rotenburg, Hereditary Prince of Hesse-Rotenburg (1705–1744), married Princess Christina of Salm had issue.
 Polyxena of Hesse-Rotenburg, Queen of Sardinia, (1706–1735) married Charles Emmanuel III of Sardinia had issue.
 Wilhelmine Magdalene Leopoldina of Hesse-Rotenburg (1707–1708) died in infancy.
 Wilhelm of Hesse-Rotenburg (1708) died in infancy.
 Sophie of Hesse-Rotenburg (1709–1711) died in infancy.
 Franciscus Alexander of Hesse-Rotenburg (1710–1739) died unmarried.
 Eleonora of Hesse-Rotenburg (1712–1759) married John Christian, Count Palatine of Sulzbach no issue.
 Caroline of Hesse-Rotenburg (1714–1741) married Louis Henri de Bourbon had issue.
 Constantine of Hesse-Rotenburg, Landgrave of Hesse-Rotenburg (1716–1778), his successor
 Christine of Hesse-Rotenburg (1717–1778) married Louis Victor of Savoy and has issue.

Ancestry

References and notes

Sources
 Hans-Günter Kittelmann: Kleiner Führer durch die Rotenburger Quart 1627–1834 und das Fürstenhaus Hessen-Rotenburg. Geschichtsverein Altkreis Rotenburg. p. 28–43

|-

1686 births
1753 deaths
Nobility from Vienna
House of Hesse-Kassel
House of Löwenstein-Wertheim
German countesses
Landgravines of Hesse-Rotenburg
17th-century German people
18th-century German people